Furudal is a locality situated in Rättvik Municipality, Dalarna County, Sweden with 407 inhabitants in 2010.

References 

Populated places in Dalarna County
Populated places in Rättvik Municipality